The Nanganjiyar River is a tributary of the Amaravathy River near Idayankottai village in Palani Taluk, Dindigul District, India.

Rivers of Tamil Nadu
Rivers of India